The term Crown Attorney's Office is the title for the various public prosecution offices (16 across Ontario) under the jurisdiction of the province of Ontario. Each Ontario Superior Court of Justice has its own Crown Attorney's Office, which conducts all criminal trial prosecutions and summary conviction appeals for cases that the province is responsible for in that court's geographical area (see Criminal law in Canada). The numerous Crown Attorney Offices, along with the Crown Law Office - Criminal and various specialized offices forms the Criminal Law Division of the Attorney General of Ontario, under the immediate supervision of the Division's Assistant Deputy Attorney General of Ontario.

Each Crown Attorney's Office is administered by a Crown Attorney and one or two Deputy Crown Attorneys. Most of Ontario's criminal cases are prosecuted by each Office's group of Assistant Crown Attorneys.

Major Cases:
 R v MT & DB (Rengel murder)
 R v DeJesus (Lisa Posluns murder)
 R v Roy (Allison Parrott murder)
 R v McKenzie (OC Transpo murder)
 R v Riley et al. (Pathfinder)
 R v Cameron, McDowell, Parish, and Saleh (Arson murder)
 R v Myers (Ardeth Wood murder)
 R v Davis (Jennifer Teague murder)
 R v Ranger & Kinkead (Ottey murders)
 R v Kimberley and Clancy (Carolyn Warrick murder)
 R v Snow (Blackburn murders)

The Crown Attorney's main office is at McMurtry-Scott Building in Toronto.

To contact the office, click https://www.ontario.ca/feedback/contact-us?id=98538&nid=97157

In June 2020, the Crown Attorney Office of Ontario made national news when they petitioned to delay the return to court over fears surrounding the 2020 Coronavirus outbreak.

See also
 Crown Attorney Office (Canada) - Canada
 Federal Prosecution Service - Canada
 Crown Office and Procurator Fiscal Service - Scotland
 Public Prosecution Service for Northern Ireland
 Crown Prosecution Service - United Kingdom

Notes and references

Prosecution
Canadian criminal law
Ontario government departments and agencies